Compsomantis semirufula is a species of praying mantis found in Malaysia, Sarawak, and the Sunda Islands.

References

Compsomantis
Mantodea of Asia
Insects described in 1923